There were 45 athletics events at the 2018 South American Games in Cochabamba, Bolivia. 23 for men and 22 for women. The events were held between June 5 and 8 at the Estadio de Atletismo GAMC.

The winner of each individual event qualifies for the 2019 Pan American Games, granted their NOC enters them into the competition.

Results

Men

Women

Medal table

Participating nations

 (24)
 (1)
 (58)
 (36)
 (28)
 (41)
 (22)
 (4)
 (7)
 (12)
 (27)
 (2)
 (7)
 (26)

References

External links
 2018 South American Games – Athletics 
 Results

 
2018 South American Games events
2018
South American Games
Qualification tournaments for the 2019 Pan American Games
2018 South American Games